The 1964 United States presidential election in Montana took place on November 3, 1964, and was part of the 1964 United States presidential election. Voters chose four representatives, or electors to the Electoral College, who voted for president and vice president.

Montana powerfully voted for the Democratic nominee, President Lyndon B. Johnson, over the Republican nominee, Senator Barry Goldwater. Johnson won Montana by a large margin of 18.38%. This is the last presidential election where a Democrat won Montana by a majority of the popular vote (Bill Clinton would win the state by a plurality in 1992). , this is the last election in which the following counties have voted for a Democratic presidential candidate: Yellowstone, Flathead, Ravalli, Park, Custer, Richland, Fergus, Granite, Powell, Teton, Carbon, Chouteau, Wheatland, Judith Basin, Pondera, Golden Valley, Toole, Liberty, Treasure, Musselshell, Phillips, Daniels, and Petroleum.

Results

Results by county

See also
 United States presidential elections in Montana

References

Montana
1964
1964 Montana elections